Clathrus is a genus of fungi of the family Phallaceae, the stinkhorn fungi. As with other members of the family, mature fruit bodies are covered with olive-brown slimy gleba, containing spores, that attracts flies. These fungi are saprobic (feeding on dead organic matter) and are common in mulch.

Species

References

External links

Agaricomycetes genera
Phallales